Pietro Gallocia or Galluzzi (c. 1120/30, in Rome – 14 March 1211, in Rome) was a Roman cardinal.

He was apostolic subdeacon and governor of Campagna in the pontificate of Pope Alexander III (1159-1181). Pope Clement III created him Cardinal-Deacon in 1188 and named him Cardinal-Bishop of Porto e Santa Rufina in 1190. He participated in the papal election, 1191 and papal election, 1198. Papal legate in Constantinople 1191–92.

In 1204 he consecrated King Peter II of Aragon, who was solemnly crowned by the Pope Innocent III. He became Dean of the Sacred College of Cardinals in April 1206. He died at Rome at very advanced age.

Notes and references

Sources
Werner Maleczek, Papst und Kardinalskolleg von 1191 bis 1216, Wien 1984, p. 95-96

12th-century Italian cardinals
Cardinal-bishops of Porto
Deans of the College of Cardinals
12th-century births
1211 deaths
Year of birth uncertain